Ellis is an unincorporated community in south central Minnehaha County, South Dakota, United States. Ellis is located approximately one mile west of the Sioux Falls city limits on Ellis Road, or 1.5 miles north of South Dakota Highway 42. The Ellis & Eastern Railroad is based in Ellis, running 14.5 miles to Brandon to the east. In 1995, the two largest commodities carried by trains were non-metallic minerals and chemicals, mostly for factories near Sioux Falls. The community is considered a part of the Sioux Falls metropolitan area.

History 
Ellis was founded on April 27, 1893, and was originally called Scoopville. The present name most likely honors A. B. Ellis, a railroad employee.

References

Unincorporated communities in Minnehaha County, South Dakota
Unincorporated communities in South Dakota
Sioux Falls, South Dakota metropolitan area